United Nations Security Council Resolution 85, adopted on July 31, 1950, was the United Nations Security Council resolution which authorized the United Nations Command to support the Korean civilian population, and requested that specialized agencies, appropriate subsidiary bodies of the UN and appropriate non-governmental organizations support the UN Command in doing so. It was adopted at the 479th meeting after United Nations Security Council Resolution 84 was passed creating the unified command. 

The selection of a commander was left to the President of the United States, who delegated the decision to the Joint Chiefs of Staff, who chose Douglas MacArthur as the first person to hold the position of the nascent administration.

The resolution was adopted with nine votes; the Socialist Federal Republic of Yugoslavia abstained. The Soviet Union was not present when voting took place, as they were protesting against the non-recognition of the newly-formed People's Republic of China.

See also
 Korean War
 List of United Nations Security Council resolutions concerning North Korea
 List of United Nations Security Council Resolutions 1 to 100 (1946–1953)

References

Bibliography

External links
 
Text of the Resolution at undocs.org

 0085
Korean War
 0085
 0085
1950 in North Korea
1950 in South Korea
1950 in Korea
July 1950 events